The Snoma Finnish Cemetery is a cemetery located about  southeast of Fruitdale, in Butte County, South Dakota, United States. In 1885, a small Finnish community called Snoma was founded nearby, and the residents built the cemetery. It was added to the National Register of Historic Places on November 13, 1985.

History
In 1885, about 40 Finnish families settled in the area and attempted to farm the land. The town had a hotel, post office, and blacksmith. John Lakson, the town's interpreter, submitted the name of either "Suomi" or "Suoma," which is Finnish for Finland, to the Post Office Department, but his handwriting was misread.

Geography
The cemetery and town rests in Butte County, South Dakota. It is located about one-half mile south of the Belle Fourche River, one-half mile southeast of Fruitdale, and about 10 miles east of Belle Fourche, South Dakota.

References

External links
 

Cemeteries on the National Register of Historic Places in South Dakota
Finnish-American culture in South Dakota
Geography of Butte County, South Dakota
National Register of Historic Places in Butte County, South Dakota